Hypolycaena schubotzi is a butterfly in the family Lycaenidae. It was described by Christopher Aurivillius in 1923. It is found in the Democratic Republic of the Congo.

References

Butterflies described in 1923
Hypolycaenini
Endemic fauna of the Democratic Republic of the Congo